Bakıxanov is a settlement and municipality in Baku, Azerbaijan. It was named after Abbasgulu Bakikhanov and has a population of 70,923. 

It contains a mosque and a public park. On the eastern side of the town is Bulbul Lake. Sabunchu lies near northwestern Bakıxanov.

Prior to 1992, it was known as Stepan Razin, named for the Cossack uprising leader Stepan Razin.

References 

Populated places in Baku
Municipalities of Baku